The Aston Martin AMR21 is a Formula One racing car designed and developed by the Aston Martin Formula One team, that competed in the 2021 Formula One World Championship. This was the first car to be entered by the returning Aston Martin team. The car was driven by Sebastian Vettel and Lance Stroll. Vettel, who has made a habit of naming his cars since his days at Toro Rosso, named his car "Honey Ryder" in reference to Ursula Andress' character in the 1962 James Bond movie Dr. No.

Initial design and development
The car is an evolution of the Racing Point RP20, used by Aston Martin's predecessor team Racing Point during the  championship.

Season summary
The car proved to be slower than its predecessor due a rule change wich modiffied the car rake. This was an step back for the team wich followed the design from Mercedes. Mercedes was another team who lost a bit of ground by this rule change. They went from dominate in 2020 to be challenged by Red Bull. Aston Martin had a 2 year old design and the team couldn't do much to evolve a design it wasn't particulary from them. Those were the main reasons they lacked in pace.

At the season-opening Bahrain Grand Prix, Stroll qualified in tenth place. Vettel initially qualified in eighteenth place but prior to the race, he received a five-place grid penalty for failing to respect double yellow flags during qualifying, dropping him to last. Stroll went on to finish tenth place, while Vettel managed to gain six positions from his starting position to fourteenth place before receiving a 10-second penalty due to a collision with Ocon on lap 45, he eventually finished in fifteenth place. At the 2021 Emilia Romagna Grand Prix, Stroll qualified in tenth place with Vettel in thirteenth place. Despite qualifying in thirteenth place, Vettel started from the pit lane due to brake issues. He eventually retired at lap 61 due to gearbox issues. Stroll initially finish in seventh place, however he was given a five-second time penalty post-race for cutting the Tamburello chicane, dropping him to eighth place. At the Azerbaijan Grand Prix, Vettel claimed Aston Martin's first podium in Formula One by finishing 2nd.

A modified AMR21 was used during testing of the 2022 tyre compounds after the 2021 Abu Dhabi Grand Prix.

Complete Formula One results
(key)

Notes
 Driver failed to finish the race, but was classified as they had completed over 90% of the winner's race distance.
 Half points awarded as less than 75% of race distance completed.

References

External links
 Official website

AMR21
2021 Formula One season cars